George Bodenheimer (born May 6, 1958) is the former president of ESPN Inc. and of ABC's sports division, known since 2006 as ESPN on ABC. He was president of ESPN since November 19, 1998 and of the former ABC Sports since March 3, 2003.

The Sports Business Journal named Bodenheimer the most influential person of 2008 on a list of 50 people.

As of January 1, 2012, Bodenheimer was the executive chairman of ESPN, with John Skipper replacing him as president. On December 18, 2017, he became acting chairman of ESPN after Skipper announced his resignation.

References

 Corporate bio
 One Chief for ESPN and ABC Sports, by George

External links 
 

1958 births
Denison University alumni
Living people
ESPN executives
American Broadcasting Company executives
Presidents of ESPN
Presidents of ABC Sports